The men's road race H3 cycling event at the 2020 Summer Paralympics took place on 1 September 2021 at Fuji Speedway in Shizuoka Prefecture. 16 riders competed in the event.

The H3 classification is paraplegics with impairments from T4 thru T10. These riders will operate using a hand-operated cycle.

Results
The event took place on 1 September 2021 at 14:20.

s.t. Same time

References

Men's road race H3